Bouchercon is an annual convention of creators and devotees of mystery and detective fiction. It is named in honour of writer, reviewer, and editor Anthony Boucher; also the inspiration for the Anthony Awards, which have been issued at the convention since 1986. This page details Bouchercon XXXVIII and the 22nd Anthony Awards ceremony.

Bouchercon
The convention was held in Madison, Wisconsin on September 27, 2007; running until the 30th. The event was chaired by authors and members of Alaska Sisters in Crime, Dana Stabenow, Dee Ford and Kimberley Gray.

Special Guests
Lifetime Achievement award — James Sallis
Special Guest of Honor — Diana Gabaldon
American Guest of Honor — Thomas Perry
Fan Guest of Honor — Barbara Peters

Anthony Awards
The following list details the awards distributed at the twenty-second annual Anthony Awards ceremony.

Novel award
Winner:
Laura Lippman, No Good Deeds

Shortlist:
Jan Burke, Kidnapped
Denise Mina, The Dead Hour
Nancy Pickard, The Virgin of Small Plains
Julia Spencer-Fleming, All Mortal Flesh

First novel award
Winner:
Louise Penny, Still Life

Shortlist:
John Hart, The King of Lies
Steve Hockensmith, Holmes on the Range
Cornelia Read, A Field of Darkness
Alexandra Sokoloff, The Harrowing

Paperback original award
Winner:
Dana Cameron, Ashes And Bones

Shortlist:
Troy Cook, 47 Rules of Highly Effective Bank Robbers
Sean Doolittle, The Cleanup
Robert Fate, Baby Shark
Victor Gischler, Shotgun Opera
Naomi Hirahara, Snakeskin Shamisen
Charlie Huston, A Dangerous Man

Short story award
Winner:
Simon Wood, "My Father's Secret", from Working Stiffs

Shortlist:
Megan Abbott, "Policy", from Damn Near Dead: Old, Bold, Uncontrolled
Dana Cameron, "The Lords of Misrule", from Sugarplums And Scandal: A feast of passion and suspense for the holidays!
Bill Crider, "Cranked", from Damn Near Dead: Old, Bold, Uncontrolled
Toni L. P. Kelner, "Sleeping with the Plush", from Alfred Hitchcock's Mystery Magazine May 2006
Elaine Viets, "After the Fall", from Alfred Hitchcock's Mystery Magazine January / February 2006

Critical / Non-fiction award
Winner:
Jim Huang & Austin Lugar, Mystery Muses

Shortlist:
Gary Warren Niebuhr, Read 'Em Their Writes
Chris Roerden, Don't Murder your Mystery
Daniel Stashower, The Beautiful Cigar Girl
E. J. Wagner, The Science of Sherlock Holmes

Special service award
Winner:
Jim Huang, Crum Creek Press and The Mystery Company

Shortlist:
Charles Ardai, Hard Case Crime
George Easter, Deadly Pleasures
Jon Jordan & Ruth Jordan, Crimespree Magazine
Lynn Kaczmarek & Chris Aldrich, Mystery News
Ali Karim, Shots Magazine
Barbara Franchi & Sharon Wheeler, ReviewingTheEvidence.com
Maddy Van Hertbruggen, 4 Mystery Addicts

References

Anthony Awards
38
2007 in Alaska